Prison Playbook is a 2017 South Korean television series directed by Shin Won-ho and starring Park Hae-soo and Jung Kyung-ho. The series marks Park Hae-soo's first-ever lead role. It aired from November 22, 2017 to January 18, 2018 on tvN's Wednesdays and Thursdays at 21:10 (KST) time slot for 16 episodes.

The series was a commercial hit and became one of the highest rated Korean series on cable television history.

Synopsis
A captivating series revolving around the lives of convicts behind bars, their families and duty officers working in the correctional facilities. It focuses on the story of a superstar baseball pitcher, Kim Je-hyuk who is convicted of assault after he saves his sister from a sexual assault.

Cast

Main
 Park Hae-soo as Kim Je-hyuk
 Lee Tae-sun as young Kim Je-hyuk
 A superstar baseball player who turns into a convict overnight after protecting his sister from an assault. Due to ultimately fatal injuries that the perpetrator suffers, he is sentenced to a year of jailtime. Despite excelling in baseball, he is quite clumsy at everything else, which is a running gag throughout the show.
 Jung Kyung-ho as Lee Joon-ho
 Lee Do-hyun as young Lee Joon-ho
 An elite prison guard and Je-hyuk's best friend. He used to play baseball with Je-hyuk in high school but had to quit because of injuries sustained in a car accident. Other prisoners and guards believe that he is just an avid fan of Kim Je-hyuk.

Supporting

People around Je-hyuk
 Krystal Jung as Kim Ji-ho
 Shin Rin-ah as child Kim Ji-ho
 Lee Chae-yoon as teenage Kim Ji-ho
 Je-hyuk's girlfriend who is a traditional Korean medicine student.
 Lim Hwa-young as Kim Je-hee
 Je-hyuk's younger sister.
 Ye Soo-jung as Je-hyuk's mother
 Kim Kyung-nam as Lee Joon-dol
 Joon-ho's younger brother who is a reporter and an avid fan of Je-hyuk.

Seobu Detention Center
 Sung Dong-il as Chief Jo Ji-ho
 A veteran chief prison guard who is quick and flexible when it comes to resolving incidents that take place inside the prison, but is known for being corrupt and easily swayed by money or other material goods that inmates can provide him.
 Jung Jae-sung as Professor Myung
  as Gal Dae-bong ( "Seagull")

Seobu Penitentiary
 Choi Moo-sung as Kim Min-chul (aka "Long-term Prisoner")
 A gang member and convicted murderer who was at first, sentenced to life imprisonment before his sentence was shortened to 25 years on appeal a decade after his trial. A model prisoner and father figure to younger inmates, especially to Lee Joo-hyung.
 Park Ho-san as Kang Chul-doo (aka "KAIST")
 An engineer who was sentenced to 3 years and 6 months’ imprisonment because of a gambling scam. He has a severe lisp, which other inmates (especially Han-yang) make fun of.
 Lee Kyu-hyung as Yoo Han-yang (aka "Second-generation Chaebol" or "Looney")
 A repeat offender for drug usage. He constantly bickers with Kaist and Captain Yoo.
 Jung Hae-in as Yoo Jeong-woo (aka "Captain Yoo")
 A commanding officer who allegedly assaulted his teammate, which led to the latter's death. He initially found it hard to live in prison but eventually began to fit in.
  as Go Park-sa (aka "Doctor Go")
 A manager of a large company who was imprisoned due to his company embezzling ten billion won and him taking the fall for it.
 Kang Seung-yoon as Lee Joo-hyung (aka “Jean Valjean”)
 A repeat offender who is unable to refrain from stealing.
 Kang Seung-yoon as Lee Jong-won, Min-chul’s fellow gang member who strongly resembles Joo-hyung. He, Min-chul and three others were found guilty of the murders of two rival gang members, but unlike Min-chul and two of their fellow co-accused, Jong-won (together with their gang leader) was sentenced to death and executed on 6 January 1996.
 Kim Sung-cheol as Kim Young-cheol (aka "Jailbird")
 A man who frequently goes in and out of prison and the first person in the prison Je-hyuk befriends. He considers Je-hyuk his brother because Je-hyuk secretly paid for his mother's life-saving surgery.
 Ahn Chang-hwan as Dong-ho (aka "Croney")
 A prisoner who stabs Je-hyuk in the shoulder, causing his left arm to be injured and unusable for baseball. Eventually, Je-hyuk is able to convince him to be on his side and be his catcher while he trains for baseball in prison.
 Jung Woong-in as Assistant Chief Paeng Se-yoon
 A fierce prison guard who likes swearing at prisoners but is actually very supportive and concerned about their well-being and reform.

Others

 Shin Jae-ha as Kim Min-sung
 A friendly and bright prisoner who works in the prison's wood workshop with Je-hyuk and Park-sa. He was sentenced to prison after a fatal car accident.
 Lee Jung-hyuk as Nexen Team GM Asst	
 Choi Sung-won as Jo Ki-cheol AKA "Spot"
 A prisoner who works in the prison's wood workshop with Je-hyuk, Park-sa, and Min-sung. He becomes the chief of operations in the workshop, replacing Yeom. 
 Lee Hoon-jin as "Soji" (goods carrier)
  as operations chief Yeom Sang-jae
 The wood workshop's operations chief. He always takes the other workers' overtime pay for himself. He is sexually attracted to Je-hyuk.
 Ahn Sang-woo as Warden Kim Yong-chul
 The prison’s warden who is obsessed with the prison having a good reputation to the public, especially during Je-hyuk's imprisonment.
 Park Hyung-soo as Department Chief Na Hyung-soo
 The strict prison guard who sticks to the rules
 Kim Han-jong as "Daehyungsoji" (heavy goods carrier)
 Prisoner who is assigned as helper in section 2 of the prison. He loves the bright and lively atmosphere of Je-hyuk's cell.
 Kang Ki-doong as Prison Guard Song Gi-dong
 A prison guard who is very talkative. He is drawn to Captain Yoo because he was once saved by him.
 Choi Yeon-dong as Vice Chief Lee Jung-jae
  as Choi Hyun-woo (prisoner)
 Lee Do-gyeom as Park Do-gyeom (prison guard)
  as Director Kim Hyuk-kwon
  as Kim Ji-ho's mother
  as Lee Joon-ho's mother
 
 Lee Moo-saeng as Captain Yoo's lawyer
 
 Jang Hyuk-jin as Yoo Han-yang's father
 Yeom Hye-ran as Yoo Han-yang's mother
 Seo Ji-hoon as Min-sik
 Han Duk-soo as News anchor
 Kim Kyung-rae as News anchor
 Ki Eun-ryung as News anchor
 
  as Chief Shim Woo-kyung (prisoner)
 
  as Baseball coach
 Bae Ho-geun as Jang Yoon-hwan
  as big prisoner
 Kim Tae-soo as Woodworking workshop inmate
 Lee Kyu-sung
 
 
 
  as a car thief
 Kim Jun-han as Song Ji-won
 Boyfriend of Yoo Han-yang who wants Han-yang to stop using drugs
 Yang Dae-hyuk as Corporal Choi
 
 
  as Doctor Jung Dae-hyun
 Ye In
 
  as Challenge Golden Bell MC
 
 Lee Sang-yi as Sergeant Oh Dong-hwan
 The real murderer in Captain Yoo's case 
  as Lim Sun-soo
 Jung Moon-sung as Yoo Jung-min
 Shin Won-ho as Joo Jung-hoon
 Kim Mo-beom as Park Joon-young
 
 Lee Do-yeop as Director Doh
 
 
 
  as CEO Nam
 Kim Jung-pal as Director Ji
 Lee Yoon-sang
 Yoo Su-bin as Yang Jung-suk
 Ji Min-hyuk as Kang Gun-woo
 Kim Ka-young
 Kwon Da-ham
 Son Kyung-won
 Shin Hee-kuk
 Jung Dong-hoon
 Seo Sang-won
  as a rapist
  as Lee Suk-eun
 Kang Duk-jung
 Jung Kyung-cheol
 Lee Jae-woo
 Lee Do-kuk as Professor Kim Jin-sung
  as a baseball teammate
 Son Kang-kuk as Taxi driver
  as Jin Woong 
 Jo Joon
 Lee Ki-hyuk as Junior guard
 Sung Hyun-joon
 Ahn Ji-hyun as Ji-ho's friend
 Choi Myung-bin as Soo-bin, Chief Paeng's daughter

Special appearance
 Yoo Jae-myung as Je-hyuk's lawyer
 Kim Sun-young as Kang Chul-doo's ex-wife

Production
 Prison Playbook is directed by Shin Won-ho, the award-winning director of Reply series and written by one of the series' junior writers, Jung Bo-hoon.
 The first script reading of the cast was held on July 17, 2017, at CJ E&M Center in Sangam-dong, Seoul.
 The filming wrapped up on January 16, 2018.

Original soundtrack

Part 1

Part 2

Part 3

Part 4

Part 5

Part 6

Part 7

Part 8

Part 9

Part 10

Commercial performance

Viewership

Awards and nominations

Notes

References

External links
  
 
 
 

TVN (South Korean TV channel) television dramas
2017 South Korean television series debuts
2018 South Korean television series endings
South Korean comedy-drama television series
Prison television series
2010s prison television series
Korean-language Netflix exclusive international distribution programming